Pauline Gauffier, born Pauline Châtillon, was a French painter established in Italy, born in Rome in 1772 and died in Florence in 1801.

Biography
Born in Rome in 1772 to French parents established in this city, Pauline Châtillon frequented the artistic circles around the French Academy in Rome at the end of the 18th century. 

She studied painting with Jean-Germain Drouais and Louis Gauffier.

She married the latter in Rome in March 1790. The couple had two children, including the future Italian miniaturist painter Faustina Malfatti (1792-1837).

Following anti-French demonstrations in Rome, the Gauffier family fled to Florence, where Pauline, in poor health, died in July 1801. Her husband, whose health had always been very weak, “followed her to the grave” two months later, “at the very moment when the Government was thinking of facilitating the means for her to exercise her talents in France”.

The architect Charles Percier made five sketches of her.

Works

References

1772 births
1801 deaths
18th-century French women
People from Rome
French women painters
18th-century French painters
Italian people of French descent